Jennifer Ann Di Toro (born May 6, 1967) is an associate judge of the Superior Court of the District of Columbia.

Education and career 
Di Toro earned her Bachelor of Arts from Wesleyan University in 1989, her Master of Philosophy from the University of Oxford in 1991, her Juris Doctor from Stanford Law School in 1997 and her Master of Laws from Georgetown University Law Center in 1999.

After graduating, Di Toro worked as an attorney at Zuckerman Spaeder, LLP. She later joined the Public Defender Service for the District of Columbia as a staff attorney in the Trial and Special Litigation Divisions. In 2004, she joined the Children’s Law Center where she served as Legal Director helping children and families get access to health care, education and permanent homes to those in need.

D.C. superior court 
President Barack Obama nominated Di Toro on February 3, 2011, to a 15-year term as an associate judge of the Superior Court of the District of Columbia to the seat vacated by Judith E. Retchin. On June 15, 2011, the Senate Committee on Homeland Security and Governmental Affairs held a hearing on her nomination. On June 29, 2011, the Committee reported her nomination favorably to the senate floor. On August 2, 2011, the full Senate confirmed her nomination by voice vote. She was sworn in on October 14, 2011.

References 

1967 births
Living people
21st-century American judges
21st-century American women judges
Alumni of the University of Oxford
Georgetown University Law Center alumni
Judges of the Superior Court of the District of Columbia
People from Princeton, New Jersey
Stanford Law School alumni
Wesleyan University alumni
Public defenders